Les Gardiner or Gardner may refer to:

 Les Gardiner (Scottish footballer), Scottish association footballer for Torquay United
 Les Gardiner (Australian footballer) (born 1923), former Australian rules footballer
Les Gardner